Nahira is a village in Kamrup, situated in north bank of river Brahmaputra .

Transport
Nahira is accessible through National Highway 31. All major private commercial vehicles ply between Nahira and nearby towns.

See also
 Naitar
 Nampara Majarkuri

References

Villages in Kamrup district